Victor Pellier (22 June 1901 – 23 June 1982) was a French racing cyclist. He rode in the 1927 Tour de France.

References

External links
 

1901 births
1982 deaths
French male cyclists
Place of birth missing
People from Compiègne
Cyclists from Hauts-de-France
Sportspeople from Oise